Rochambeau Farm is a historic home and farm complex located near Manakin-Sabot, Goochland County, Virginia.  The main dwelling was built about 1855, and is an "L"-shaped full two-story frame structure set on a common bond brick foundation in the Greek Revival style. It has a low hip roof and three single-story colonnade porches.

Also on the property are the contributing library (c. 1750–1810), the woodshed with a three-hole privy in the rear, the old smokehouse (now farm office) with attached toolshed, lumber shed, the garage, the new smoke house (1917/18), a chicken house, milk cow barn (near ruin), run-in shed, two-stall horse barn (near ruin), and hay storage barn (1965) with tack room (1997). One contributing structure and two contributing sites include the original farm house well, the site of the old ice house and the vegetable garden, containing an archaeological site.

It was listed on the National Register of Historic Places in 1999.

References

Houses on the National Register of Historic Places in Virginia
Farms on the National Register of Historic Places in Virginia
Greek Revival houses in Virginia
Houses completed in 1855
Houses in Goochland County, Virginia
National Register of Historic Places in Goochland County, Virginia